This article lists the main modern pentathlon events and their results for 2004.

2004 Summer Olympics (UIPM)
 August 26 & 27: Modern pentathlon at the 2004 Summer Olympics in  Athens at Goudi Olympic Complex
 Men:   Andrey Moiseyev;   Andrejus Zadneprovskis;   Libor Capalini
 Women:   Zsuzsanna Vörös;   Jeļena Rubļevska;   Georgina Harland

Other international modern pentathlon events
 September 23 & 24: 2004 CISM Modern Pentathlon Championships in  Székesfehérvár
 Individual winners:  Libor Capalini (m) /  Jeļena Rubļevska (f)
 Women's Team Relay winners:  (Claudia Corsini, Sara Bertoli, & Giulia Cafiero)

World modern pentathlon events
 May 29 & 30: 2004 World Modern Pentathlon Championships in  Moscow
 Individual winners:  Andrejus Zadneprovskis (m) /  Zsuzsanna Vörös (f)
 Men's Team Relay winners:  (Aleksei Turkin, Dmitri Galkine, & Andrey Moiseyev)
 Women's Team Relay winners:  (Paulina Boenisz, Marta Dziadura, & Magdalena Sedziak)
 July 28: 2004 World Junior Modern Pentathlon Championships in  Székesfehérvár
 Junior Individual winners:  Sergei Shouin (m) /  Sylwia Gawlikowska (f)
 Junior Men's Team Relay winners:  (Alexei Velikodnyi & Mikhail Kuznetov)
 Junior Women's Team Relay winners:  (Mhairi Spence, Katy Livingston, & Heather Fell)
 September 15: 2004 World Youth "A" Modern Pentathlon Championships in  Albena
 Youth Individual winners:  Nick Woodbridge (m) /  Aya Medany (f)

Continental modern pentathlon events
 Note: There seems to be an error here, with regards to the European championships host city by the UIPM. It has both Mafra and Albena hosting the same event here.
 February 29: 2004 African Modern Pentathlon Championships in  Cairo
 Individual winners:  Gábor Balogh (m) /  Jeļena Rubļevska (f)
 April 14: 2004 Asian Modern Pentathlon Championships in  Beijing
 Individual winners:  HAN Do-ryung (m) /  Ludmila Sirotkina (f)
 April 17 & 20: 2004 European Modern Pentathlon Championships in  Mafra
 Individual winners:  Róbert Kasza (m) /  Katalin Prill (f)
 Men's Team Relay winners:  (Szymon Staśkiewicz, Lukasz Lis, & Michal Kacer)
 Women's Team Relay winners:  (Ildiko Hidvegi, Katalin Prill, & Zsofia Bartalis)
 May 18 & 19: 2004 European Junior Modern Pentathlon Championships in  Drzonków
 Junior Individual winners:  Cedric Pla (m) /  Polina Struchkova (f)
 September 27: 2004 European Modern Pentathlon Championships in  Albena
 Individual winners:  Edvinas Krungolcas (m) /  Csilla Füri (f)
 Men's Team Relay winner:  Ádám Marosi
 Women's Team Relay winners:  (Adrienn Szathmary, Zsuzsanna Vörös, & Csilla Füri)

2004 Modern Pentathlon World Cup
 March 14: MPWC #1 in  Querétaro City
 Individual winners:  Erik Johansson (m) /  Jeļena Rubļevska (f)
 March 20 & 21: MPWC #2 in  Rio de Janeiro
 Individual winners:  Viktor Horváth (m) /  Georgina Harland (f)
 April 24 & 26: MPWC #3 in  Beijing
 Individual winners:  Gábor Balogh (m) /  Tatiana Mouratova (f)
 May 8 & 9: MPWC #4 in  Budapest
 Individual winners:  Andrey Moiseyev (m) /  Victoria Tereshchuk (f)
 September 11 & 12: MPWC #5 (final) in  Darmstadt
 Individual winners:  Edvinas Krungolcas (m) /  Kate Allenby (f)

References

External links
 Union Internationale de Pentathlon Moderne Website (UIPM)

 
Modern pentathlon
2004 in sports